Festuca ampla is a species of grass described and named by the botanist Eduard Hackel in 1880. F. ampla often thrives in habitats that include humid environments, arid soil, and sandy areas. This species grows in temperate biomes and is a perennial.  This species is native to Southwest Europe and North Africa.

Characteristics
Festuca ampla can grow up to 50 to 100 cm in height. Its leaves of are distichously arranged, clasped, and linear with a blue-green hue. The flowers of F. ampla are in panicles.

References

ampla
Plants described in 1880
Flora of Portugal
Flora of Spain
Flora of Morocco
Taxa named by Eduard Hackel